Birutė Valionytė (born 7 October 1956 in Rokiškis District Municipality) is a Lithuanian politician. In 1990 she was among those who signed the Act of the Re-Establishment of the State of Lithuania.

References
 Biography 

1956 births
Living people
20th-century Lithuanian women politicians
People from Rokiškis District Municipality